The 2011 Currie Cup Premier Division was the 73rd season in the competition since it started in 1889 and was contested from July to October 2011.  The tournament (known as the Absa Currie Cup Premier Division for sponsorship reasons) is the top tier of South Africa's premier domestic rugby union competition.
The MTN Golden Lions won the 2011 Currie Cup Premier Division.

Competition

Regular season and title playoffs
There were 8 participating teams in the 2011 Currie Cup Premier Division. These teams played each other twice over the course of the season, once at home and once away.

Teams received four points for a win and two points for a draw. Bonus points were awarded to teams that scored 4 or more tries in a game, as well as to teams that lost a match by 7 points or less. Teams were ranked by points, then points difference (points scored less points conceded).

The top 4 teams qualified for the title play-offs. In the semifinals, the team that finished first had home advantage against the team that finished fourth, while the team that finished second had home advantage against the team that finished third. The winners of these semi-finals played each other in the final, at the home venue of the higher-placed team.

Relegation
The 2012 Currie Cup Premier Division will only consist of six teams, so the bottom 2 teams will be relegated to the 2012 Currie Cup First Division.

Teams

Changes from 2010
None, no teams were relegated.

Team Listing

Table

Fixtures and results
 Fixtures are subject to change.
 All times are South African (GMT+2).

Compulsory Friendlies

Regular season

Round one

Round two

Round three

Round four

Round Five

Round Six

Round Seven

Round Eight

Round Nine

Round Ten

Round Eleven

Round Twelve

Round Thirteen

Round Fourteen

Title Play-Off Games

Semi-finals

Final

Top scorers
The following sections contain only points and tries which have been scored in competitive games in the 2011 Currie Cup Premier Division.

Top points scorers

Last updated: 29 Oct 2011 Source: South African Rugby Union

Top try scorers

Last updated: 29 Oct 2011 Source: South African Rugby Union

Awards

See also
 2011 Currie Cup First Division
 2011 Vodacom Cup
 2011 Under-21 Provincial Championship
 2011 Under-19 Provincial Championship
 Currie Cup
 ABSA

References

External links
 
 

 
2011
2011 in South African rugby union
2011 rugby union tournaments for clubs